The SAS Championship is a golf tournament on the PGA Tour Champions. It is played annually in the autumn in Cary, North Carolina at the Prestonwood Country Club. SAS Institute is the main sponsor of the tournament.

The purse for the 2020 tournament was US$2,100,000, with $315,000 going to the winner. The tournament was founded in 2001.

Winners

Sources:

Notes

References

External links
Coverage on the PGA Tour Champions official site

PGA Tour Champions events
Golf in North Carolina
Recurring sporting events established in 2001
Sports in Wake County, North Carolina